{{Infobox Basketball club
| color1 =#FFFFFF
| color2 =#000000
| color3 = 	#FFA500
| name          = Glass City Wranglers
| current       = 
| logo          = Glass City Wranglers.png
| image_size    = 190px 
| division      = 
| founded       = 2020
| league        = Premier Basketball League 2020–2021The Basketball League 2022-present
| history       = Toledo Glass City B.C2020–2022Glass City Wranglers2023–present
| arena         = Owens Community College
| city          = Toledo, Ohio
| colors        =   
| owner         = Andrew Lovelace 
| president     = 
| gm            = Joshua Radtkin 
| coach         = Freddie Zamora
| championships = 1 (2021 PBL)
| titles        =
| dancers       =
| mascot        =
| website       = 
}}

The Glass City Wranglers, formerly the Toledo Glass City B.C''', are a professional basketball team in Toledo, Ohio, and members of The Basketball League (TBL).

History
The Toledo Glass City B.C were founded in 2020 by Anthony Shook and joined the minor professional Premier Basketball League (PBL) for the 2020-2021 season. On August 30, the team named Freddie Zamora as its head coach. Glass City was unbeaten and won the Premier Basketball League tournament championship, during its first season. On June 23, 2021, the team announced Andrew Lovelace as its new team owner and general manager.

On July 15, 2021, The Basketball League (TBL) announced they would join the league for the 2022 TBL season.

On February 25, 2022 the team announced that the home venue is  Owens Community College On June 15, 2022 the team made national headlines as the team player, Myles Copeland, saved the life of referee John Sculli during a playoff game against the Jamestown Jackals.

References

External links

Sports teams in Toledo, Ohio
Basketball teams in Ohio
The Basketball League teams